"I Can't Believe She Gives It All to Me" is a song written and recorded by American country music artist Conway Twitty.  It was released in November 1976 as the first single from the album Play Guitar Play.  The song was Twitty's 18th number one on the country chart.  The single stayed at number one for a single week and spent a total of 12 weeks on the country chart.

Charts

Weekly charts

Year-end charts

References

1976 singles
Conway Twitty songs
Songs written by Conway Twitty
Song recordings produced by Owen Bradley
MCA Records singles
1976 songs